The year 1650 in music involved some significant events.

Events

Publications 
Alberich Mazak – , volume two, a collection of his complete works, published in Vienna
Claudio Monteverdi –  (Mass for four voices, and Psalms arranged for one, two, three, four, five, six, seven, and eight voices) (Venice: Alessandro Vincenti), published posthumously

Classical music 
Melchior Franck –  for five voices (Coburg: Johann Eyrich), published posthumously
Samuel Scheidt – 
Heinrich Schütz – , part 3
probable
Giovanni Battista Abatessa –  (Garland of Various Flowers), a collection of guitar music, published in Milan
Giovanni Battista Granata – , a collection of guitar music, published in Bologna

Opera 
Francesco Cavalli –

Births 
date unknown
Joachim Neander, hymn-writer (d. 1680)
André Raison, organist and composer (d. 1719)
probable
Cataldo Amodei, Italian composer (d. c. 1695)
Papanasa Mudaliar, Carnatic music composer (d. 1725)
Giovanni Battista Rogeri, luthier
Robert de Visée, luthenist, guitarist and viol player (d. 1725)

Deaths 
May 20 – Francesco Sacrati, composer (b. 1605)
November 24 – Manuel Cardoso, organist and composer (b. 1566)
date unknown – Martin Peerson (born ca. 1571 – ca. 1573; died 1650 or 1651), English composer, organist and virginalist

 
17th century in music
Music by year